West Ceram Regency is a regency of Maluku, Indonesia. It is mainly located on Ceram, but includes various islands lying to the west of Ceram -- Manipa, Kelang, Boano, as well as the smaller islets of Babi, Pua, Masowoi and Marsegu. It covers a land area of 6,948.40 km2, and had a population of 164,654 at the 2010 Census and 212,393 at the 2020 Census; the official estimate as at mid 2021 was 212,495. The principal town lies at Piru, a port at the northern coast of Latira Bay (Teluk Latira) which almost separates the Huamual Peninsula from the rest of Seram Island. The western sector of the Regency (the Huamual Peninsula and the islands off the west coast) occupies just under 25% of the land area, but held over 42% of the Regency's population at the 2020 Census.

Administrative districts 
At the time of the 2010 Census the regency was divided into four districts (kecamatan). Subsequent to 2010, seven additional districts have been created by the division of the original four districts, so that the regency is now divided into eleven districts. These are tabulated below with their areas and populations at the 2010 Census and 2020 Census, together with the official estimates as at mid 2021. The table also includes the locations of the district headquarters, as well as the number of villages (desa) in each district, and its postal code. 

Notes: (a) Huamual Belakang District includes Boano, Kelang, Babi and Pua Islands, and 26 other small islands, as well as part of the 'mainland' of Seram. (b) Manipa Islands District consists of the main island of Manipa together with adjacent small islands; it was formerly part of Huamual Belakang District. (c) formerly part of Seram Barat District. (d) formerly part of Kairatu District. (e) the 2021 estimates for Taniwel and Taniwel Timur are highly questionable, but these are the official figures quoted. (f) formerly part of Taniwel District.

References

External links